Salzhausen is a Samtgemeinde ("collective municipality") in the district of Harburg, in Lower Saxony, Germany. Its seat is in the village Salzhausen.  

The Samtgemeinde Salzhausen consists of the following municipalities:

 Eyendorf
 Garlstorf
 Garstedt
 Gödenstorf
 Salzhausen
 Toppenstedt
 Vierhöfen
 Wulfsen

Samtgemeinden in Lower Saxony